Miniver, an unspotted white fur edged with grey, derives from the winter coat of the red squirrel. Miniver differs from ermine (stoat) fur in that it does not include the distinctive black tails of the stoat but is formed of distinctive grey edged panels cut from the complete fur and framing the white belly.  From a red squirrel, which has a greyish-white winter coat with a white underside, miniver gros, or vair, is the whole fur, including the grey, and miniver pure retains only the white part.  The heraldic fur, vair, translates the grey into blue, and alternates back and belly.

See also

References

Fur